Aleksandr Viktorovich Bakhtin (born 20 January 1971) is a former Russian football player.

Honours
Qarabağ-Azersun
Azerbaijan Premier League bronze: 2001–02

References

1971 births
Footballers from Moscow
Living people
Russian footballers
Russian expatriate footballers
Expatriate footballers in Finland
FC Okean Nakhodka players
FC Chernomorets Novorossiysk players
Russian Premier League players
FC Akhmat Grozny players
Qarabağ FK players
Expatriate footballers in Azerbaijan
Association football midfielders
FC Novokuznetsk players